Chitinases (EC 3.2.1.14, chitodextrinase, 1,4-β-poly-N-acetylglucosaminidase, poly-β-glucosaminidase, β-1,4-poly-N-acetyl glucosamidinase, poly[1,4-(N-acetyl-β-D-glucosaminide)] glycanohydrolase, (1→4)-2-acetamido-2-deoxy-β-D-glucan glycanohydrolase; systematic name (1→4)-2-acetamido-2-deoxy-β-D-glucan glycanohydrolase) are hydrolytic enzymes that break down glycosidic bonds in chitin. They catalyse the following reaction:

 Random endo-hydrolysis of N-acetyl-β-D-glucosaminide (1→4)-β-linkages in chitin and chitodextrins

As chitin is a component of the cell walls of fungi and exoskeletal elements of some animals (including mollusks and arthropods), chitinases are generally found in organisms that either need to reshape their own chitin or dissolve and digest the chitin of fungi or animals.

Species distribution 

Chitinivorous organisms include many bacteria (Aeromonads, Bacillus, Vibrio, among others), which may be pathogenic or detritivorous.  They attack living arthropods, zooplankton or fungi or they may degrade the remains of these organisms.

Fungi, such as Coccidioides immitis, also possess degradative chitinases related to their role as detritivores and also to their potential as arthropod pathogens.

Chitinases are also present in plants – for example barley seed chitinase: , . Barley seeds are found to produce clone 10 in Ignatius et al 1994(a). They find clone 10, a Class I chitinase, in the seed aleurone during development. Leaves produce several isozymes (as well as several of β-1,3-glucanase). Ignatius et al 1994(b) find these in the leaves, induced by powdery mildew. Ignatius et al also find these (seed and leaf isozymes) to differ from each other. Some of these are pathogenesis related (PR) proteins that are induced as part of systemic acquired resistance. Expression is mediated by the NPR1 gene and the salicylic acid pathway, both involved in resistance to fungal and insect attack.  Other plant chitinases may be required for creating fungal symbioses.

Although mammals do not produce chitin, they have two functional chitinases, Chitotriosidase (CHIT1) and acidic mammalian chitinase (AMCase), as well as chitinase-like proteins (such as YKL-40) that have high sequence similarity but lack chitinase activity.

Classification 

 Endochitinases (EC 3.2.1.14) randomly split chitin at internal sites of the chitin microfibril, forming soluble, low molecular mass multimer products. The multimer products includes di-acetylchitobiose, chitotriose, and chitotetraose, with the dimer being the predominant product.
Exochitinases have also been divided into two sub categories:
 Chitobiosidases act on the non-reducing end of the chitin microfibril, releasing the dimer, di-acetylchitobiose, one by one from the chitin chain. Therefore, there is no release of monosaccharides or oligosaccharides in this reaction.
 β-1,4- N-acetylglucosaminidases split the multimer products, such as di-acetylchitobiose, chitotriose, and chitotetraose, into monomers of N-acetylglucoseamine (GlcNAc).

Chitinases were also classified based on the amino acid sequences, as that would be more helpful in understanding the evolutionary relationships of these enzymes to each other. Therefore, the chitinases were grouped into three families: 18, 19, and 20. Both families 18 and 19 consists of endochitinases from a variety of different organisms, including viruses, bacteria, fungi, insect, and plants. However, family 19 mainly comprises plant chitinases. Family 20 includes N-acetylglucosaminidase and a similar enzyme, N-acetylhexosaminidase.

And as the gene sequences of the chitinases were known, they were further classified into six classes based on their sequences. Characteristics that determined the classes of chitinases were the N-terminal sequence, localization of the enzyme, isoelectric pH, signal peptide, and inducers.

 chitinases had a cysteine-rich N-terminal, leucine- or valine-rich signal peptide, and vacuolar localization. Class 1 chitinases were found to comprise only plant chitinases and mostly endochitinases.

 chitinases did not have the cysteine-rich N-terminal but had a similar sequence to Class I chitinases. Class II chitinases were found in plants, fungi, and bacteria and mostly consisted of exochitinases.

 chitinases did not have similar sequences to chitinases in Class I or Class II.

 chitinases had similar characteristics, including the immunological properties, as Class I chitinases. However, Class IV chitinases were significantly smaller in size compared to Class I chitinases.

 and  chitinases are not well characterized. However, one example of a Class V chitinase showed two chitin binding domains in tandem, and based on the gene sequence, the cysteine-rich N-terminal seemed to have been lost during evolution, probably due to less selection pressure that caused the catalytic domain to lose its function.

Function 
Like cellulose, chitin is an abundant biopolymer that is relatively resistant to degradation. Many mammals can digest chitin and the specific chitinase levels in vertebrate species are adapted to their feeding behaviours. Certain fish are able to digest chitin. Chitinases have been isolated from the stomachs of mammals, including humans.

Chitinase activity can also be detected in human blood and possibly cartilage.  As in plant chitinases this may be related to pathogen resistance.

Clinical significance 
Chitinases production in the human body (known as "human chitinases") may be in response to allergies, and asthma has been linked to enhanced chitinase expression levels.

Human chitinases may explain the link between some of the most common allergies (dust mites, mold spores—both of which contain chitin) and worm (helminth) infections, as part of one version of the hygiene hypothesis (worms have chitinous mouthparts to hold the intestinal wall). Finally, the link between chitinases and salicylic acid in plants is well established—but there is a hypothetical link between salicylic acid and allergies in humans.

May be used to monitor enzymotherapy supplementation in Gaucher's disease.

Regulation in fungi 
Regulation varies from species to species, and within an organism, chitinases with different physiological functions would be under different regulation mechanisms. For example, chitinases that are involved in maintenance, such as remodeling the cell wall, are constitutively expressed. However, chitinases that have specialized functions, such as degrading exogenous chitin or participating in cell division, need spatio-temporal regulation of the chitinase activity.

The regulation of an endochitinase in Trichoderma atroviride is dependent on a N-acetylglucosaminidase, and the data indicates a feedback-loop where the break down of chitin produces N-acetylglucosamine, which would be possibly taken up and triggers up-regulation of the chitinbiosidases.

In Saccharomyces cerevisiae and the regulation of ScCts1p (S. cerevisiae chitinase 1), one of the chitinases involved in cell separation after cytokinesis by degrading the chitin of the primary septum. As these types of chitinases are important in cell division, there must be tight regulation and activation. Specifically, Cts1 expression has to be activated in daughter cells during late mitosis and the protein has to localize at the daughter site of the septum. And to do this, there must be coordination with other networks controlling the different phases of the cell, such as Cdc14 Early Anaphase Release (FEAR), mitotic exit network (MEN), and regulation of Ace2p (transcription factor) and cellular morphogenesis (RAM) signalling networks. Overall, the integration of the different regulatory networks allows for the cell wall degrading chitinase to function dependent on the cell's stage in the cell cycle and at specific locations among the daughter cells.

Presence in food 
Chitinases occur naturally in many common foods. Phaseoleus vulgaris, bananas, chestnuts, kiwifruit, avocados, papaya, and tomatoes, for example, all contain significant levels of chitinase, as defense against fungal and invertebrate attack. Stress, or environmental signals like ethylene gas, may stimulate increased production of chitinase.

Some parts of chitinase molecules, almost identical in structure to hevein or other proteins in rubber latex due to their similar function in plant defense, may trigger an allergic cross-reaction known as latex-fruit syndrome.

Applications 
Chitinases have a wealth of applications, some of which have already been realized by industry. This includes bio-conversion of chitin to useful products such as fertilizer, the production of non-allergenic, non-toxic, biocompatible, and biodegradable materials (contact lenses, artificial skin and sutures with these qualities are already being produced) and enhancement of insecticides and fungicides. Phaseolus vulgaris chitinase - bean chitinase, BCH - has been transgenically inserted as a pest deterrent into entirely unrelated crops.

Possible future applications of chitinases are as food additives to increase shelf life, therapeutic agent for asthma and chronic rhinosinusitis, as an anti-fungal remedy, an anti-tumor drug and as a general ingredient to be used in protein engineering.

See also 
Ligninase

References

External links 
 
 The X-ray structure of a chitinase from the pathogenic fungus Coccidioides immitis

EC 3.2.1
Enzymes